Qaim Deen aka Baba Qaim Sain (Urdu بابا قائم سائیں سرکار ) was famous Sufi saint in Faisalabad city from Qadiriyya and Qalandariyya Silsila. He died on 16 March 1987 Islamic date 17 Rajab 1400.There is one road of Faisalabad city is named after Baba Qaim Sain. Baba Qaim Sain Shrine is located near Ghulam Muhammad Abad area of Faisalabad. Adjacent to shrine there is a big mosque and Graveyard. Baba Qaim Sain was influenced by Data Sahib Ali Hujwiri Lahore.

See also
Baba Noor Shah Wali
Baba Lasoori Shah

References

People from Faisalabad
Punjabi Sufi saints
Sufi shrines in Pakistan
Sufism in Pakistan
1987 deaths